Elizabeth Mary "Mollie" Child (8 August 1908 – October 1989) was an English cricketer who played as a batter. She appeared in 6 Test matches for England between 1934 and 1937. She played domestic cricket for various regional sides, as well as Surrey.

References

External links
 
 

1908 births
1989 deaths
People from Harpenden
England women Test cricketers
Surrey women cricketers